The AAAI Conference on Artificial Intelligence (AAAI) is one of the leading international academic conference in artificial intelligence held annually. Along with ICML, NeurIPS and ICLR, it is one of the primary conferences of high impact in machine learning and artificial intelligence research. It is supported by the Association for the Advancement of Artificial Intelligence. Precise dates vary from year to year, but paper submissions are generally due at the end of August to beginning of September, and the conference is generally held during the following February. The first AAAI was held in 1980 at Stanford University, Stanford California.

During AAAI-20 conference, AI pioneers and 2018 Turing Award winners Yann LeCun and Yoshua Bengio among eight other researchers were honored as the AAAI 2020 Fellows.

Along with other conferences such as NeurIPS, ICML, AAAI uses artificial intelligence algorithm to assign papers to reviewers.

Locations 
  AAAI-2022 Virtual Conference
  AAAI-2021 Virtual Conference
  AAAI-2020 Hilton New York Midtown, New York, New York, United States
  AAAI-2019 Hilton Hawaiian Village, Honolulu, Hawaii, United States
  AAAI-2018 Hilton New Orleans Riverside, New Orleans, Louisiana, United States
  AAAI-2017 San Francisco, California, United States
  AAAI-2016 Phoenix, Arizona, United States
  AAAI-2015 Austin, Texas, United States
  AAAI-2014 Québec Convention Center, Québec City, Québec, Canada
  AAAI-2013 Bellevue, Washington, United States
  AAAI-2012 Toronto, Ontario, Canada
  AAAI-2011 San Francisco, California, United States
  AAAI-2010 Westin Peachtree Plaza, Atlanta, Georgia, United States
  AAAI-2008 Chicago, Illinois, United States
  AAAI-2007 Toronto, Ontario, Canada
  AAAI-2006 Boston, Massachusetts, United States
  AAAI-2005 Pittsburgh, Pennsylvania, United States
  AAAI-2004 San Jose, California, United States
  AAAI-2002 Shaw conference center in Edmonton, Alberta, Canada
  AAAI-2000 Austin, Texas, United States
  AAAI-1999 Orlando, Florida, United States
  AAAI-1998 Madison, Wisconsin, United States
  AAAI-1997 Providence, Rhode Island, United States
  AAAI-1996 Portland, Oregon, United States
  AAAI-1994 Seattle, Washington, United States
  AAAI-1993 Washington Convention Center, Washington, D.C., United States
  AAAI-1992 San Jose Convention Center, San Jose, California, United States
  AAAI-1991 Anaheim Convention Center, Anaheim, California, United States
  AAAI-1990 Boston, Massachusetts, United States
  AAAI-1988 Saint Paul, Minnesota, United States
  AAAI-1987 Seattle, Washington, United States
  AAAI-1986 Philadelphia, Pennsylvania, United States
  AAAI-1984 University of Texas, Austin, Texas, United States
  AAAI-1983 Washington, D.C., United States
  AAAI-1982 Carnegie Mellon University and the University of Pittsburgh, Pittsburgh, Pennsylvania, United States
  AAAI-1980 Stanford, California, United States

See also 
 ICML
 ICLR
 Journal of Machine Learning Research
 Machine Learning (journal)
 NeurIPS

References

External links 
 Official website

Artificial intelligence conferences